The 2021 Indiana Hoosiers baseball team are a college baseball team that represents Indiana University in the 2021 NCAA Division I baseball season. The Hoosiers are members of the Big Ten Conference (B1G) and play their home games at Bart Kaufman Field in Bloomington, Indiana. They are led by third-year head coach Jeff Mercer.

Previous season
The Hoosiers finished the 2020 NCAA Division I baseball season 9–6 overall (0–0 conference) and fifth place in conference standings. On March 12, 2020, the Big Ten Conference cancelled the remainder of all winter and spring sports seasons due to the coronavirus pandemic.

MLB draft 
The following Hoosiers on the 2020 roster were selected in the 2020 Major League Baseball draft or signed in free agency:

Preseason
Due to the ongoing COVID-19 pandemic, the B1G Conference delayed setting a season schedule, before releasing a truncated, all-conference schedule on February 17, 2021. In addition to the release of the schedule, the Big Ten also stated that the games will be played without fans this season.

Season projections
Coming off of a shortened season in 2020, the 2021 Hoosiers are projected to finish first in conference play by Perfect Game and second in conference play by D1Baseball. On March 4, the Big Ten Coaches voted the Hoosiers to finish second in the conference. The Hoosiers received preseason vote for rankings by Collegiate Baseball.

Roster

Schedule

! style="" | Regular Season
|- valign="top" 

|- bgcolor="#ffcccc"
| 1 ||  || vs  || || U.S. Bank Stadium • Minneapolis, Minnesota, || 1–2 || 90 || 0–1 || 0–1
|- bgcolor="#ccffcc"
| 2 ||  || at  || || U.S. Bank Stadium • Minneapolis, Minnesota  || 5–2 || 150 || 1–1 || 1–1
|- bgcolor="#ccffcc"
| 3 || March 6 || vs Rutgers || || U.S. Bank Stadium • Minneapolis, Minnesota  || 4–2 || 50 || 2–1 || 2–1
|- bgcolor="#ccffcc"
| 4 || March 7 || vs Minnesota || || U.S. Bank Stadium • Minneapolis, Minnesota  || 8–1 || 146 || 3–1 || 3–1
|- bgcolor="#bbbbbb"
| 5 ||  ||  || || Bart Kaufman Field • Bloomington, Indiana || Postponed || || 3–1 || 3–1
|- bgcolor="#bbbbbb"
| 6 ||  || Penn State || || Bart Kaufman Field • Bloomington, Indiana || Postponed || – || 3–1 || 3–1
|- bgcolor="#ccffcc"
| 7 ||  || Penn State || || Bart Kaufman Field • Bloomington, Indiana || 7–2 || 150 || 4–1 || 4–1
|- bgcolor="#ccffcc"
| 8 ||  || Penn State || || Bart Kaufman Field • Bloomington, Indiana || 8–0 || 150 || 5–1 || 5–1
|- bgcolor="#ccffcc"
| 9 ||  || Penn State || || Bart Kaufman Field • Bloomington, Indiana || 6–5 || 150 || 6–1 || 6–1
|- bgcolor="#ccffcc"
| 10 ||  || Penn State || || Bart Kaufman Field • Bloomington, Indiana || 2–1 || 150 || 7–1 || 7–1
|- bgcolor="#ccffcc"
| 11 || March 19 || Purdue || || Bart Kaufman Field • Bloomington, Indiana || 2–1 || 225 || 8–1 || 8–1
|- bgcolor="#ffcccc"
| 12 || March 20 || Purdue || || Bart Kaufman Field • Bloomington, Indiana || 5–8 || 150 || 8–2 || 8–2
|- bgcolor="#ccffcc"
| 13 || March 21 || Purdue || || Bart Kaufman Field • Bloomington, Indiana || 9–4 || 150 || 9–2 || 9–2
|- bgcolor="#ccffcc"
| 14 || March 26 || at  || || Drayton McLane Baseball Stadium at John H. Kobs Field • East Lansing, Michigan, || 8–2 || 136 || 10–2 || 10–2
|- bgcolor="#ccffcc"
| 15 || March 27 || at Michigan State || || Drayton McLane Baseball Stadium at John H. Kobs Field • East Lansing, Michigan || 10–4 || 144 || 11–2 || 11–2
|- bgcolor="#ffcccc"
| 16 || March 28 || at Michigan State || || Drayton McLane Baseball Stadium at John H. Kobs Field • East Lansing, Michigan || 1–5 || 115 || 11–3 || 11–3
|-

|- bgcolor="#ffcccc"
| 17 || April 2 || at Ohio State || || Bill Davis Stadium • Columbus, Ohio, || 2–3 || 171 || 11–4 || 11–4
|- bgcolor="#ffcccc"
| 18 ||  || at Ohio State || || Bill Davis Stadium • Columbus, Ohio || 0–6 || 286 || 11–5 || 11–5
|- bgcolor="#ffcccc"
| 19 ||  || at Ohio State || || Bill Davis Stadium • Columbus, Ohio || 2–5 || 286 || 11–6 || 11–6
|- bgcolor="#ffcccc"
| 20 || April 4 || at Ohio State || || Bill Davis Stadium • Columbus, Ohio || 3–4 || 215 || 11–7 || 11–7
|- bgcolor="#ccffcc"
| 21 || April 9 ||  || || Bart Kaufman Field • Bloomington, Indiana || 6–4 || 150 || 12–7 || 12–7
|- bgcolor="#ccffcc"
| 22 || April 10 || Illinois || || Bart Kaufman Field • Bloomington, Indiana || 8–0 || 150 || 13–7 || 13–7
|- bgcolor="#bbbbbb"
| 23 || April 11 || Illinois || || Bart Kaufman Field • Bloomington, Indiana || Postponed || – || 13–7 || 13–7
|- bgcolor="#ccffcc"
| 24 || April 16 || at Northwestern || || Rocky Miller Park • Evanston, Illinois, || 5–4 || 57 || 14–7 || 14–7
|- bgcolor="#ffcccc"
| 25 || April 17 || at Northwestern || || Rocky Miller Park • Evanston, Illinois || 5–8 || 63 || 14–8 || 14–8
|- bgcolor="#ccffcc"
| 26 || April 18 || at Northwestern || || Rocky Miller Park • Evanston, Illinois || 4–0 || – || 15–8 || 15–8
|- bgcolor="#ccffcc"
| 27 ||  ||  || || Bart Kaufman Field • Bloomington, Indiana || 9–3 || 150 || 16–8 || 16–8
|- bgcolor="#ccffcc"
| 28 ||  || Minnesota || || Bart Kaufman Field • Bloomington, Indiana || 7–1 || 150 || 17–8 || 17–8
|- bgcolor="#ccffcc"
| 29 || April 25 || Minnesota || || Bart Kaufman Field • Bloomington, Indiana || 23–1 || 150 || 18–8 || 18–8
|- bgcolor="#ffcccc"
| 30 || April 30 || Iowa || || Bart Kaufman Field • Bloomington, Indiana || 5–6 || 150 || 18–9 || 18–9
|-

|- bgcolor="#ccffcc"
| 31 || May 1 || Iowa || || Bart Kaufman Field • Bloomington, Indiana || 12–6 || 150 || 19–9 || 19–9
|- bgcolor="#ccffcc"
| 32 || May 2 || Iowa || || Bart Kaufman Field • Bloomingtonn, Indiana || 12–8 || 150 || 20–9 || 20–9
|- bgcolor="#ccffcc"
| 33 || May 7 || at  || || Bainton Field • Piscataway, New Jersey, || 8–3 || 225 || 21–9 || 21–9
|- bgcolor="#ccffcc"
| 34 ||  || at Rutgers || || Bainton Field • Piscataway, New Jersey || 5–3 || 225 || 22–9 || 22–9
|- bgcolor="#ffcccc"
| 35 ||  || vs Nebraska || || Bainton Field • Piscataway, New Jersey || 6–7 || 150 || 22–10 || 22–10
|- bgcolor="#ccffcc"
| 36 || May 9 || vs Nebraska || || Bainton Field • Piscataway, New Jersey || 4–2 || 150 || 23–10 || 23–10
|- bgcolor="#ffcccc"
| 37 || May 14 || at Michigan || || Ray Fisher Stadium • Ann Arbor, Michigan, || 3–10 || 250 || 23–11 || 23–11
|- bgcolor="#ccffcc"
| 38 || May 15 || at Michigan || || Ray Fisher Stadium • Ann Arbor, Michigan || 13–8 || 250 || 24–11 || 24–11
|- bgcolor="#ffcccc"
| 39 || May 16 || at Michigan || || Ray Fisher Stadium • Ann Arbor, Michigan || 1–6 || 250 || 24–12 || 24–12
|- bgcolor="#ffcccc"
| 40 ||  ||  || ||Bart Kaufman Field • Bloomington, Indiana || 2–3 || 150 || 24–13 || 24–13
|- bgcolor="#ffcccc"
| 41 || May 21 || Nebraska || || Bart Kaufman Field • Bloomington, Indiana || 5–8 || 150 || 24–14 || 24–14
|- bgcolor="#ffcccc"
| 42 || May 22 || Nebraska || || Bart Kaufman Field • Bloomington, Indiana || 1–3 || 150 || 24–15 || 24–15
|- bgcolor="#ffcccc"
| 43 || May 23 || Ohio State || || Bart Kaufman Field • Bloomington, Indiana || 1–3 || 150 || 24–16 || 24–16
|- bgcolor="#ccffcc"
| 44 || May 24 || Ohio State || || Bart Kaufman Field • Bloomington, Indiana || 2-0|| 150 || 25–16 || 25-16
|- align="center" bgcolor="#ffcccc"
| 45 || May 29 || at Maryland || || Bob "Turtle" Smith Stadium • College Park, Maryland || 3-4|| 250 || 25–17 || 25-17
|- align="center" bgcolor="#ffcccc" 
| 46 || May 29 || at Maryland || || Bob "Turtle" Smith Stadium • College Park, Maryland || 2-5|| 250 || 25–18 || 25-18
|- align="center" bgcolor="#ccffcc"
| 47 || May 30 || at Maryland || || Bob "Turtle" Smith Stadium • College Park, Maryland || 7-3|| 500 || 26–18 || 26-18
|-

| Schedule Source
|-
| "#" represents ranking. All rankings from Collegiate Baseball on the date of the contest."()" represents postseason seeding in the Big 10 Tournament or NCAA Regional, respectively.

Ranking movements

Awards and honors

Pre-season awards / Watch list

Regular season awards / Watch lists

Conference awards

Award watch lists
Listed in the order that they were released

2021 MLB draft
The Hoosiers had six players selected in the 2021 MLB draft, most in the Big Ten.

See also
 2021 Big Ten Conference baseball tournament
 2021 NCAA Division I baseball tournament

References

Indiana
Indiana Hoosiers baseball seasons
Indiana